Boreus brumalis, the mid-winter boreu, is a species of snow scorpionfly in the family Boreidae. It is found in North America.

References

Further reading

 
 
 
 
 

Boreus
Insects described in 1847
Insects of North America